Cailin Russo is an American model and musician. She is best known for her appearances in Justin Bieber music videos.

Early life 
Russo was born to rock musician Scott Russo, lead vocalist of the band Unwritten Law, and Jodi Russo (née Kirtland), and was raised in Encinitas, CA. She is the subject of Unwritten Law's 1998 song "Cailin". She also has two brothers.

Career 
Russo began modeling "accidentally". She has modeled for brands such as Forever 21, Wildfox Couture, Ocean Pacific, Pacsun, American Apparel, Free People, and Brandy Melville. Russo was cast as Justin Bieber's love interest in the music videos "All That Matters" and "Confident" by a family friend.

Music 
Russo is the lead singer of her eponymous band RUSSO. In 2018, she released an EP, House with a Pool, and has since released two singles: "Phoenix" and "Love No More." She cites Missy Elliott, OutKast, 
Gorillaz, Gwen Stefani, Bill Withers, Lauryn Hill, and Stevie Wonder as influences. RUSSO's sound has been described as "grunge-influenced punk rock, with a pinch of pop thrown in for good measure." They have toured with Jessie Ware and Madison Beer. RUSSO includes drummer Hayley Brownell, guitarist Tyler McCarthy, and bassist Sean Ritchie.

She collaborated with Chrissy Costanza in the song "Phoenix" that was made for the League of Legends World Championship 2019.

References 

Living people
Models from San Diego
American female models
American women singers
Female models from California
Singers from California
Year of birth missing (living people)
21st-century American women